Farzali may refer to:
 Fərzalı, Azerbaijan
 Fərzili, Azerbaijan
 Farzali, Iran